Charisma University (CU) is an academic institution located in the Turks and Caicos Islands (TCI), British Overseas Territories of the United Kingdom.
Charisma University is a non-profit institution recognized by the Turks and Caicos Islands Ministry of Education, Labour, Employment and Customer Service  to offer accredited undergraduate, graduate, post-graduate degree programs and certificate programs in various disciplines taught by over 100 faculty members.

The university has a historic commitment to adult learners; to provide online and on-campus education that is flexible, on-demand, and innovative in utilizing sound education technologies and techniques. Charisma's degrees are structured to allow students the flexibility to schedule their course work around other responsibilities.

The Center for Advanced Research and Innovation (CARI)  was established as an independent organization under the auspices of Charisma University. The Center provides facilities for higher research in various areas of Humanities, Social Science and Technology disciplines. CARI is also aimed at establishing and promoting exchange programs with academic, research, training institutes and think tank organizations at home and abroad.

Charisma University is an institutional member of the American Council on Education (ACE). ACE member institutions have a historic commitment to adult learners. ACE is a recognized organization and a supporter of the Council for Higher Education Accreditation (CHEA). ACE is a member of the International Association of Universities (IAU).

Charisma University is a member of the CHEA (Council for Higher Education Accreditation) International Quality Group (CIQG). The CHEA International Quality Group (CIQG) advances the understanding of international quality assurance and promotes high-quality higher education through international accreditation bodies worldwide. The CHEA International Quality Group (CIQG) provides a database of recognized accreditation agencies globally. It is a non-profit, non-governmental association focused on U.S. and non-U.S. accreditation and higher education quality assurance worldwide.

Accreditation  
Charisma University is recognized by the Turks and Caicos Islands Ministry of Education, Labour, Employment and Customer Service as a degree-granting institution for associate degree, Bachelor's degree, Master's degree, and the Doctorate along with Certificate programs. Ministry of Education, Labour, Employment and Customer Service is recognized by the Council for Higher Education Accreditation (CHEA).

Charisma University is accredited by the Accreditation Council for Business Schools and Programs (ACBSP). ACBSP accredits business, accounting, and business-related programs at the associate, baccalaureate, master, and doctorate degree levels worldwide. ACBSP is recognized by the Council for Higher Education Accreditation (CHEA).

Charisma University is institutionally accredited by the Accreditation, Certification, and Quality Assurance Institute (ACQUIN).
The German Accreditation Council recognizes ACQUIN. According to this council, system accreditation is the internal quality assurance system of a university. ACQUIN is a member of and is recognized by various international agencies such as: the European Association for Quality Assurance in Higher Education (ENQA), the European University Association (EUA), the Central Eastern European Network for Quality Assurance (CEENQA), and the International Network for Quality Assurance Agencies in Higher Education (INQAAHE).

Charisma University is listed on the European Quality Assurance Register for Higher Education (EQAR). The European Quality Assurance Register for Higher Education (EQAR) is the European Association for Quality Assurance in Higher Education's (ENQA) and the European Higher Education Area's (EHEA) official register of QAAs, listing those that substantially comply with the ESG.

Charisma University is listed in the collaborative International Association of Universities (IAU) and United Nations Educational, Scientific and Cultural Organization (UNESCO) World Higher Education Database (WHED). Charisma University's IAU Global WHED ID is: IAU-026987. The World Higher Education Database (WHED) is recognized as an official source of information on some 19,400 higher education institutions (HEIs) in 196 countries and territories by national higher education authorities, governmental agencies and/or national academic bodies at global level.

Schools, faculties and institutes
The university currently offers over forty-degree programs and three graduate certificates in its six schools:
 School of Business
 School of Education
 School of Law
 School of Philosophy and Religion
 School of Psychology and Behavioral Science
 School of Health Sciences

University rankings
The Knowledge Review Magazine selected Charisma University as one of the 10 Best Universities of Caribbean Islands in 2019.

Charisma University is listed and ranked 801+ in the Impact Rankings: Quality education 2021 in the Times Higher Education World University Rankings.

See also
 List of universities in the United Kingdom

References

External links
 Official Website
Education System

Educational organisations based in the Turks and Caicos Islands
Educational institutions established in 2011
2011 establishments in the Turks and Caicos Islands
Buildings and structures in Providenciales